Anne Marie de Bethune (1610-1688), was a French court official.  She served as the dame d'atour to the queen of France, Maria Theresa of Spain from 1660 to 1683.  She was a central figure in the French royal court and mentioned in contemporary memoirs.

She was the daughter of François de Beauvilliers, 1st duc de Saint-Aignan, sister of Paul de Beauvilliers, 2nd duc de Saint-Aignan, and married in 1629 to Hippolyte de Béthune (1603-1665).

References

1610 births
1688 deaths
French ladies-in-waiting
Household of Maria Theresa of Spain